Zoomorphs is a line of educational building toys made by River Dolphin Toys, a Brooklyn-based company. Each set of Zoomorphs contains between 30 and 100 plastic animal pieces that can be snapped together to form actual creatures, such as a cat or dinosaur, or rearranged to create fantasy creatures, such as a dino-cat-horse-bird. Each set's pieces are interchangeable with the pieces of all the other sets. As of late 2006, Zoomorphs were available in nearly 1,100 specialty toy stores.

Sets
There are currently eleven sets of Zoomorphs. There are nine sets based on real animals and two sets of Mythmorphs, which were released in early 2008. The sets are:
 MountainMorphs, which contains a Bluebird, a Bighorn, a Grizzly, and a Mountain King Snake.
 Dinomorphs, which contains a stegosaur, a T-Rex, a duckbill, and a pteranodon.
 Runners, which contains a gazelle, a velociraptor, a beetle, and a cassowary.
 Nightmorphs, which contains a fruit bat, a cat, a desert lizard, a lantern fish, a firefly, and a snake.
 Pets, which contains a pony, a husky, a goldfish, and a lovebird.
 Insects, which contains a red ant, a cave bug, a wasp, and a monarch.
 Rain Forest, which contains a conure, a panther, a crocodile, and a tropical frog.
 Fossil Morphs, which contains a mammoth, a Brontosaurus, a sea scorpion, and an ancient amphibian.
 Safarimorphs, which contains a lizard, a parrot, a leopard, an elephant, a zebra, and a butterfly.
 Mythmorphs Gold, which contains a unicorn, the Loch Ness Monster, a sea dragon, and a griffon.
 Mythmorphs Silver, which contains a phoenix, a pegasus, a wyvern, a golden boar, a capricorn, and a dragon.

Awards
 Zoomorphs received TDmonthly'''s Top Seller 2007 Award.
 The discontinued Fliers set was nominated for the Family Fun'' Toy of the Year Award in 2005.
 Zoomorphs was named Best Toy of 2008 in the Construction/Building Category by Leapin' Lizards Toy Co.

References

External links
Official Website
Kids Toys Center

Toy brands
2000s toys
Toy animals
Educational toys
Construction toys